Edendale Technical High School is a public school in South Africa.

Overview
Edendale Technical High school is situated on the east of Pietermaritzburg, KwaZulu Natal. The school is a mixed gender even though when it was initially opened to only cater for boys. In 1996 the school allowed girls to also enroll. Edendale Technical High school is the most performing school around Edendale area and most of the parents prefers to enroll their kids in the school. Edendale Technical High school offers technical subjects such as mechanical technology; woodwork and electrical technology. It also offers commercial subjects which includes economics and accounting. The school has an enrollment of ~1000 learners and through the years the enrollment has increased.   

In 2016 the school celebrated its 60th anniversary.

Notable alumni
Mr Justice Jeremiah Shongwe, judge of the Supreme Court of Appeal of South Africa
Mr Andries Tshabalala Pr. Eng. B.Sc. Eng., Executive Director of Alstom SA (Pty) Ltd and past president of the South African Institute of Electrical Engineers

Sport
A full programme of sporting activities is available. Sports offered by the school include:
Volleyball
Netball
Football
Tennis

Other extramural activities include:
Chess
Choir
Quiz
School band

Campus
The campus has:
a library,
a computer centre and 
three workshops

Awards and honours
The school is one of the best performing schools in Edendale with in which more than 80% of candidates pass the matriculation examinations.

According to the Department of Education 2014 results Edendale Technical School 91% of its matric candidates passed, and in 2013 81% passed and in 2012 the pass rate was 75%. The pass rates for mathematics and science remain low.

References

Schools in KwaZulu-Natal
High schools in South Africa
Educational institutions established in 1956
1956 establishments in South Africa